The enzyme retinoid isomerohydrolase (EC 3.1.1.64,  all-trans-retinyl-palmitate hydrolase) catalyzes the reaction

an all-trans-retinyl ester + H2O = 11-cis-retinol + a fatty acid

This enzyme belongs to the family of hydrolases, specifically those acting on carboxylic ester bonds.  The systematic name is ''all-trans-retinyl ester acylhydrolase, 11-cis'' retinol-forming. This enzyme participates in retinol metabolism.

References

 

EC 3.1.1
Enzymes of unknown structure